Westlake Golf Course is an 18-hole regulation length golf course located in Westlake Village, California, USA.  It is an 18-hole course designed by Ted Robinson, ASGCA in 1964. It features  of golf from the longest tees for a par of 67.  The course rating is 63.2 and it has a slope rating of 93.

References

External links
 Southern Ca golf courses

Golf clubs and courses in California
Westlake Village, California
Sports venues in Los Angeles County, California